Tuberostylis is a genus of Mesoamerican and South American plants in the tribe Eupatorieae within the family Asteraceae.

 Species
 Tuberostylis axillaris S.F.Blake - Colombia
 Tuberostylis rhizophorae Steetz - Ecuador, Colombia, Panamá

References

Eupatorieae
Flora of Central America
Asteraceae genera
Flora of western South America